Divna Veković (or Vékovitch) (1886–1944) was the first female medical doctor in Montenegro. She was born in Lužac, a village in the municipality of Berane. She completed her medical degree at the Sorbonne in 1907.   She was a physician at the Salonika front during World War I.  Veković was also a humanitarian and a literary translator. She was the first to translate The Mountain Wreath (Gorski Viyénatz) from the Serbian language into the French language (Les lauriers de la montagne). The work is a well-known epic poem in Montenegrin literature written by Petar II Petrović-Njegoš. Veković also translated other poems such as that of the  Serbian poet Jovan Jovanović Zmaj.

She continued her work as a medical doctor until her death before the end of World War II.

References 

1886 births
1944 deaths
Montenegrin physicians
Montenegrin women physicians
20th-century translators
Montenegrin writers
20th-century women writers

People from Berane
University of Paris alumni
Expatriates of the Principality of Montenegro in France